Oleg Smirnov may refer to:
 Oleg Aleksandrovich Smirnov (b. 1964), Soviet and Russian footballer with FC Spartak Moscow, FC Rotor Volgograd and FC Shinnik Yaroslavl
 Oleg Igorevich Smirnov (b. 1967), Transnistrian politician
 Oleg Smirnov (ice hockey) (b. 1980), Russian ice hockey player drafted by Edmonton Oilers in 1998
 Oleg Smirnov (Paralympic footballer), Russian footballer who competed in the 2004 and 2008 Paralympics, see Football 7-a-side at the 2008 Summer Paralympics
 Oleg Valeryevich Smirnov (b. 1990), Russian footballer, goalkeeper

See also
 Smirnov (surname)
 Smirnoff (surname)